Neil Alan John Coyle (born 30 December 1978) is a British politician who has served as the Member of Parliament (MP) for Bermondsey and Old Southwark since 2015. He was elected MP as a member of the Labour Party, but was suspended from the party on 11 February 2022. He previously served as a member of Southwark London Borough Council from 2010 to 2016.

Early life and education
Coyle grew up in Luton and is one of six children. He went to Wenlock and Ashcroft schools before being educated at the Bedford School, an independent school for boys founded in 1552. He received a BA in British Politics and Legislative Studies from the University of Hull. From 2001 to 2003, he lived in China.

Coyle was elected as a councillor for Newington ward in the Southwark London Borough Council election 2010. As a councillor, he supported the unsuccessful Garden Bridge project, on which his wife worked as a landscape architect. He was deputy mayor of Southwark from 2014 to 2015. He stood down as a councillor in 2016.

Parliamentary career

Coyle defeated the Liberal Democrat incumbent, Simon Hughes, to take the seat of Bermondsey and Old Southwark at the 2015 general election. He was one of 36 Labour MPs to nominate Jeremy Corbyn as a candidate in the Labour leadership election of 2015. Following his election, he was appointed Parliamentary Private Secretary to the Shadow Leader of the House of Commons.

Following the May 2016 elections, he co-wrote an article with Jo Cox which said that they had "come to regret" the decision of voting to make Jeremy Corbyn leader of the opposition. After the article was published, Coyle resigned from the shadow cabinet. He then supported Owen Smith in his unsuccessful attempt to replace Jeremy Corbyn in the 2016 leadership election. Coyle was highly critical of Corbyn and wrote a series of articles arguing against his position on several key issues, such as terrorism and Brexit.

In the 2016 referendum on the UK leaving the European Union (EU), Coyle campaigned to remain.

In February 2017, Coyle was one of 47 Labour MPs who defied the party's three-line whip to vote against triggering Article 50 for the UK to leave the EU and has called for it to be revoked. Coyle sits on the Work and Pensions Select Committee. At the 2017 snap general election, Coyle increased his majority.

He chairs the All-Party Parliamentary Group (APPG) for Wines and Spirits, the secretariat for which is provided by the Wine and Spirit Trade Association, which is based in Coyle's constituency. He also chairs the APPG for Foodbanks, which he established in 2017, as well as those for Ending Homelessness and Counter Extremism. He is a member of the Co-operative Party and Progressive Britain.

In February 2019, Coyle said that he had declined an invitation to join The Independent Group, later Change UK, a splinter group of centrist Labour and Conservative MPs that formed that month.

In May 2021, Coyle reported Corbyn to the Parliamentary Commissioner for Standards, claiming that Corbyn had failed to declare full legal funding. The Commissioner did not uphold the complaint, noting there was no requirement to register legal support from a membership organisation.

On 11 February 2022, as a result of controversial statements by Coyle, the Labour whip was suspended from him and he was barred from all bars on the Westminster estate (see Alleged Sinophobia below). Coyle also had his Labour Party membership administratively suspended, pending an investigation.

Controversial statements

Boris Johnson
Coyle has been criticised for his use of language in public on a number of occasions. In September 2019, Coyle referred to Prime Minister Boris Johnson on British television as "a dick". Following the incident, Coyle spoke with the Southwark News, saying his constituents had complained about his use of language, suggesting he does not "need to be that crude". Coyle told the Southwark News, "I will be toning down the language but never the passion".

Brexit and Piers Morgan
Three weeks after the first incident, Coyle again used inappropriate language on his Twitter account. During the 2019 Labour Party Conference, Jeremy Corbyn made a Brexit statement that the Labour Party would not be immediately backing either leave or remain. Many Labour MPs voiced their concerns, but Coyle went a step further by describing Corbyn's stance as "bullshit".

Coyle again received media coverage after a day of strongly-worded statements in the House of Commons. Labour MPs and their leader, Corbyn, were critical of Boris Johnson's use of language, including when Johnson suggested that the best way to honour Jo Cox was to deliver Brexit. Journalist and presenter Piers Morgan then tweeted about the use of Jo Cox's name, saying "Parliament has reached a new low on all sides. Disgraceful". Coyle replied on Twitter in several posts, telling Morgan to "go fuck yourself", while also calling him a "sick little man" and a "scrote".

Jacob Rees-Mogg
On 25 August 2020, in a now deleted tweet, Coyle wrote, "I have spent years warning local people that these fat old racists won't stop blaming the EU when their shit hits the fan. Here they come blaming others. Absolute shitbag racist wankers". This was in response to a tweet by fellow parliamentarian Jacob Rees-Mogg, who had criticised the BBC's decision to omit the traditional singing of "Rule, Britannia" which ordinarily took place during the final evening of the Proms. Coyle followed this tweet up with a further tweet, referring to the song, "If you didn't hate it before, feel free to hate the song now. I've never known anyone but shitlickers like it tbh". Coyle later apologised for his tweets.

Later in 2020, Rees-Mogg accused UNICEF of a political stunt after it announced for the first time in its 70-year history it would be providing food parcels to children in deprived areas of London prior to Christmas. Rees-Mogg said that UNICEF were "playing politics when it is meant to be looking after people in the poorest, the most deprived countries in the world, where people are starving, where there are famines and where there are civil wars". Rees-Mogg was branded a "Scrooge" by Coyle, who invited Rees-Mogg to visit Coyle's constituency, one of the affected areas.

Swearing
On 31 January 2022, Coyle was involved in a swearing fit at a Labour aide in a Westminster bar following a disagreement about the effects of Brexit and told a Conservative MP who intervened to calm the dispute to "fuck off and lose some weight".

Alleged Sinophobia
In early February 2022, Coyle was accused of making Sinophobic remarks on 1 February to Henry Dyer, a political reporter of British-Chinese origin. It was reported Coyle said to Dyer that he could tell "from how you look like you've been giving renminbi to Barry Gardiner", following the latter's receiving funds from an agent of the Chinese state. 
According to Dyer, while discussing Gardiner, Coyle also said he had been funded by "Fu Manchu". Consequently, on 11 February, Coyle had the Labour whip suspended pending an investigation and was banned from all bars on the Westminster estate.

Dyer claimed Coyle refused to apologise when he confronted him, with Coyle asking him, "if it was just the case that [Dyer] was being over-sensitive". After the incident was made public and reported to the Speaker of the House, Coyle apologised for his "insensitive comments" and said he would be cooperating with the investigation. Coyle faced calls to resign.

In July 2022, Coyle claimed he drank a lot because working as a MP is stressful.

In March 2023, Coyle was found to have breached Parliament's bullying and harassment policy and was suspended from the Commons for five days.
Coyle had the Labour whip withdrawn since February 2022, and Labour faces a decision over whether to lift the suspension or not. As of March 2023, Coyle remains administratively suspended from Labour.

Sexual harassment
In March 2023, it was revealed that Coyle had a sexual harassment complaint upheld against him as a Labour MP. Coyle made derogatory remarks about the partner of a young woman and asked her if she was "going back with me or him tonight then?" 
Coyle did not resign, unlike his Parliamentary colleague Patrick Grady who, under the influence of alcohol, sexually harassed a member of his party.

Personal life
Coyle married Sarah Lindars in 2014. His wife is a landscape architect and they have one daughter. Coyle has written about the impact on his family of his mother's mental ill-health.

References

External links

1978 births
Alumni of the University of Hull
Councillors in the London Borough of Southwark
Independent members of the House of Commons of the United Kingdom
Labour Party (UK) MPs for English constituencies
Labour Party (UK) councillors
Living people
People educated at Bedford School
People from Luton
UK MPs 2015–2017
UK MPs 2017–2019
UK MPs 2019–present